Dolphin was a New Zealand cutter of 10 tons.

Voyages and notable incidents 
Dolphin was a cutter-rigged cargo boat of 10 tons, belonging Lyttelton Harbour.

Wreck 
In early December 1862, Dolphin had sailed to one of the bays of the harbour to load lime.

On starting back to Lyttelton, the wind and tide were both unfavourable. Dolphin drifted and the crew were unable to wear the vessel. It was carried on to rocks near Quail Island, capsized, and became a total wreck. The crew of three escaped in the dinghy.

References 

Shipwrecks of Banks Peninsula
Maritime incidents in December 1862
Cutters
Lyttelton, New Zealand